Välkommen till min jul, was released on 5 November 2001, and is a Jan Malmsjö Christmas album. The album peaked at 20th position at the Swedish albums chart.

Track listing
Bella Notte
Frid på Jorden
En släde för två (Sleigh Ride)
Stilla natt (Stille Nacht, heilige Nacht)
När frosten nyper i din kind (The Christmas Song) 
När det lider mot jul
På himlen tändas ett ljus 
Julen är här
Jag ska hem till julen (I'll Be Home for Christmas)
Klang min vackra bjällra
Dagen är kommen (O Come all ye Faithful)
Hosiana in Exelcis Deo
Den lilla trumslagarpojken (The Little Drummer Boy)

Charts

Contributors
Peter Ljung - piano
Staffan Astner, Billy Bremner, Micke Littwold - guitar
Sven Lindvall - drums
Johan Granström - bass

References 

Jan Malmsjö albums
2001 Christmas albums
Christmas albums by Swedish artists
Schlager Christmas albums